Marthinus Jacobus Fourie (born 23 July 1979) is a former Irish cricketer. He is a right-handed batsman and a right-arm medium-pace bowler. He has played in the Ireland A cricket team since 2004, when he played for the first time against Marylebone Cricket Club. He also participated in the EurAsia Cricket Series of 2006.

Fourie is a middle order batsman and a decently paced bowler in the Irish attack.

He currently coaches cricket at Gonzaga College.

1979 births
Living people
Irish cricketers
Ireland One Day International cricketers
Afrikaner people
Cricketers from Cape Town